The 2003 Osun State gubernatorial election occurred on 19 April 2003. PDP's Olagunsoye Oyinlola won election for a first tenure, defeating Incumbent Governor, AD's Adebisi Akande and ANPP's Lai Oriowo.

Olagunsoye Oyinlola won out of over 22 PDP governorship aspirants at the primary election. His running mate was Olusola Obada.

Electoral system
The Governor of Osun State is elected using the plurality voting system.

Results
A total of three candidates registered with the Independent National Electoral Commission to contest in the election. PDP candidate Olagunsoye Oyinlola won election for a first tenure, defeating AD Incumbent Governor, Adebisi Akande, and ANPP's Lai Oriowo.

The total number of registered voters in the state was 1,367,627. However, only 58.63% (i.e. 801,812) of registered voters participated in the excerise.

References 

Osun State gubernatorial elections
Gubernatorial election 2003
Osun State gubernatorial election